San Agustín is the Spanish-language name for St. Augustine.

San Agustín may also refer to:

People
Joe T. San Agustin, Guamanian politician

Places

Argentina
San Agustín, Córdoba

Bolivia
San Agustín, Bolivia
San Agustín River, a river in Bolivia

Colombia
San Agustín, Huila

El Salvador
San Agustín, Usulután

Guatemala
San Agustín Acasaguastlán

Honduras
San Agustín, Copán

Mexico

Chihuahua
San Agustín, Chihuahua

Hidalgo
San Agustín Metzquititlán
San Agustín Tlaxiaca

Jalisco
 San Agustín, Jalisco

State of Mexico
San Agustín Altamirano, State of Mexico

Mexico City
San Agustín de las Cuevas

Monterrrey
Plaza Fiesta San Agustín, a shopping mall in Monterrey, Mexico

Oaxaca
San Agustín Amatengo
San Agustín Atenango	
San Agustín Chayuco
San Agustín de las Juntas	
San Agustín Etla	
San Agustín Loxicha	
San Agustín Tlacotepec	
San Agustín Yatareni

Spain
San Agustin, Las Palmas, Canary Islands
San Agustín, Teruel
San Agustín del Guadalix

Philippines
San Agustin, Isabela
San Agustin, Romblon
San Agustin, Surigao del Sur
San Agustin, Samar Gandara

Peru
Church of San Agustín, Lima

Trinidad and Tobago
Saint Augustine, Trinidad and Tobago

United States
Cathedral of San Agustin
San Agustin de Laredo Historic District 
St. Augustine, Florida
San Augustine, Texas
Plains of San Agustin, located in the U.S. state of New Mexico

Other uses
Asociación Deportiva San Agustín, a Peruvian football club
CB Bahía San Agustín, a basketball team in Palma, Majorca, Spain
Colegio San Agustin, several schools with the name or a similar name
Rancho San Agustin, Mexican land grant in modern California, United States
San Agustin (band), an American musical group from Georgia
San Agustin Church (Manila)*  A UNESCO Religious Heritage sited Church located in Intramuros
Spanish ship San Agustín (1768), a warship launched in 1768
University of San Agustin, Iloilo, Philippines

See also
Saint Augustine (disambiguation)